Bird Claw, also known as Animal Skull I and Ete I (fl. 6th century), was an ajaw of the Maya city of Tikal. The monument associated with Bird Claw is Stelae 8. He carried a high-ranking name but no Tikal emblem.

Notes

Footnotes

References

Rulers of Tikal
6th century in the Maya civilization
6th-century monarchs in North America